DIFF or diff may refer to:

  a file comparison tool
 Data comparison, methods and implementations to compare texts or files
 Dubai International Film Festival
 Dublin International Film Festival
 Dharamshala International Film Festival
 a motor vehicle's differential (mechanical device)
 White blood cell differential, a medical test enumerating each type of white blood cell

See also
 Help:Diff, for information on diffs of pages in Wikipedia
 https://diff.wikimedia.org, a Wikimedia blog